DYQN (89.5 FM), broadcasting as DWIZ 89.5, is a radio station owned and operated by Aliw Broadcasting Corporation. The station's studio and transmitter are located along 3/F Eternal Life Bldg., J.M. Basa cor. Ortiz St., Iloilo City.

History
The station was established in November 1993 as Q89. It carried a Top 40 format.

In 1999, the station rebranded as Home Radio Q89 and switched to an easy listening format. The Q89 brand was dropped the following year.

On March 17, 2014, Home Radio, along with the other provincial stations, reformatted into a mass-based format, with "Natural!" as its slogan.

On Easter Sunday 2015, the station switched back to its Top 40 format mixed with OPM, simply known as CHR Local. On late 2015, the station adopted the slogan "The Music of Now" and shifted to a fully-fledged Top 40 format.

In July 2017, Home Radio flipped back to its easy listening format. In 2018, Home Radio's provincial stations started simulcasting DWIZ 882's program Karambola, thus allowing the station to include news and commentaries in the morning to the station's format. In 2021, the simulcast expanded to include the entire morning block of DWIZ 882.

On January 16, 2023, the station dropped the Home Radio branding, but continued its programming. On January 30, 2023 it was relaunched under the DWIZ network with a news and talk format.

References

Aliw Broadcasting Corporation
Home Radio Network
Radio stations in Iloilo City
Adult contemporary radio stations in the Philippines
Radio stations established in 1993